Komna is a town and block in Nuapada district of Odisha, India. Komna is the biggest block or taluk in Nuapada district. Komna is 39  km distance from its District Main City Nuapada, and 330 km distant from its State Main City, Bhubaneswar. This town is situated in western side of Odisha and near the border of Chhattisgarh state.

Demographics 
, total population of Komna block was 117,834, where it constitutes 49.5% of male and 50.5%  female. Due to the lack of infrastructure of the town because it is situated in Nuapada district which is considered as one of the backward districts of Odisha, certain communities or backward caste are most of the total population as total SC population of the town was 15,980 and Total ST population was 52086.

Block Administration
It is the biggest block of Nuapada district. There are 27 Gram Panchayats (GP's) under Komna Block:
Agreen Panchayat
Bhella Panchayat
Budhikomna Panchayat
Darlipada Panchayat
Gandamer Panchayat
Jadamunda Panchayat
Jatgarh Panchayat
Jhagrahi Panchayat

Kandetara Panchayat
Komna Panchayat
Konabira Panchayat
Kureswar Panchayat
Kurumpuri Panchayat
Lakhna Panchayat
Michhapali Panchayat
Mundapala Panchayat
Nuagaon Panchayat
Pendrawan Panchayat
Rajana Panchayat
Samarsing Panchayat
Sialati Panchayat
Silva Panchayat
Soseng Panchayat
Sunabeda Panchayat
Tarbod Panchayat
Thickpali Panchayat
Tikrapada Panchayat

Languages 
The chief communicative language of the town is Sambalpuri which is a dialect of Odia and is used as the official language for communication.

Education
Due to lack of awareness about education among the people and protectiveness of the tribal peoples about females in the district as it affects the female literacy. Female literacy is very low as compared to male literacy of the block.

Absolute literates and literacy rate
According to the census of 2011, the block was

SCHOOLS
Prathamika Balaka Vidyalaya, Komna
Girls Proj U.P.School, Komna
Jita Mitra High School, Komna
Kasturaba Gandhi Balika Vidyalaya, Komna
Krishna Public School, Komna
Saraswati Shishu Vidya Mandir, Komna
Sri Aurobindo Purnanga Shiksha Kendra, Komna

COLLEGES
 Panchayat Samiti Degree College, Komna
 Panchayat samiti Junior college Komna
 Panchayat Junior College, Budhikomna (Komna)

Temples 
ମା ସମଲେଶ୍ବରୀ ମନ୍ଦିର

ଶିବ ମନ୍ଦିର

ଜଗନ୍ନାଥ ମନ୍ଦିର

ମା ଚଣ୍ଡୀ ସମଲେଶ୍ବରୀ ମନ୍ଦିର, 

ହନୁମାନ ମନ୍ଦିର

ମା ଭଣ୍ଡାରଘରୁଆଣି,

ମା ବୈଷ୍ଣଦେବୀ

Festivals 
Nuakhai
Rathayatra
Diwali
Holi
Makar Sakranti
Dasara

References

External links
Gram Panchayat under Komna Block
Komna Block Information
Block level GIS Atlas
Nuapada District Information

Cities and towns in Nuapada district